Glendale–Burbank is a defunct Pacific Electric railway line that was operational from 1904 to 1955 in Southern California, running from Downtown Los Angeles to Burbank via Glendale. Short lines terminated Downtown and in North Glendale, including the popular Edendale Local.

Route

The route started at the Subway Terminal Building. Once out of the Hollywood Subway, dual tracks traversed the Toluca yard, crossed under the Beverly Boulevard Viaduct into the center of Glendale Boulevard where they ran northerly across Temple Street, and in the 1950s under the Hollywood Freeway. Following in the pavement of Glendale Boulevard, the tracks ran directly to the west of Park Junction at intersection Park Avenue (one block south of Sunset Boulevard). There was a connection up Park Avenue to the Hollywood Line on Sunset Boulevard. 

The Glendale Line, crossed under the Sunset Boulevard Bridge where it entered a three-track private way which allowed passing of the Glendale and Edendale cars. The three-track private way extended north, in the center of Glendale Boulevard, past Montana Street, Alvarado Street, and Berkeley Street as far as Effie Street.

Double-track street operation was then resumed and ran to Allesandro Street. Here, the dual tracks left Glendale Boulevard to enter a private way through the Ivanhoe Hills, past Lakeview Avenue and India Street to eventually run parallel to Riverside Drive. The line continued northwesterly, still along the edge of the Hills, to Monte Santo, (Glendale Boulevard and Riverside Drive).

From Monte Santo, a series of three bridges carried the tracks northeasterly over Riverside Drive and Los Angeles River. The line then traversed the Atwater district in a private right of way in the center of Glendale Boulevard to the Glendale city limit where the line crossed Southern Pacific's Coast Line at-grade (where Glendale Boulevard becomes Brand Boulevard).

The dual rails then crossed San Fernando Road where the private way ended and the line continued northerly in the pavement of Brand Boulevard, crossing Los Feliz Boulevard, Chevy Chase Boulevard, Colorado Boulevard, Broadway and Lexington Drive. The main line continued north to Verdugo Wash where the line became a single track.

At Arden Junction at Glenoaks Boulevard, the line branched. The old main line continued north in the pavement of Brand Boulevard to a terminus in North Glendale at Mountain Avenue. The Burbank Line diverged westerly as a single-track line on private way in the center of Glenoaks Boulevard, then continued westerly past Central, Pacific, Highland, western, and Alameda Avenues to a terminus in Burbank at Cypress Avenue. From 1925 to 1940 the Burbank Line continued west, following Glenoaks Boulevard, on private way to Ben Mar Hills (Eton Drive).

List of major stations

History

Construction of the Brand Boulevard segment between Arcade Depot and Glendale was begun by the Los Angeles & Glendale Electric Railway in 1903, but the new company sold the rights to the line to the Los Angeles Inter-Urban Railway by the following spring. The line opened on April 6, 1904, terminating at Mountain Street.

Los Angeles Inter-Urban went on to be leased then acquired by the Pacific Electric, with the latter assuming service in July 1908. Initially originating at Main Street, service to Burbank began on September 5, 1911. The Broadway branch to East Glendale (shared with the Glendale and Montrose Railway) began service on May 1, 1914.

Pacific Electric briefly established a joint-service with the Glendale and Montrose Railway between 1916 and 1917 — cars ran from the Pacific Electric Building to Glendale Avenue on the East Glendale branch and turned north on the G&M tracks to La Crescenta. The route and partnership were discontinued in less than a year due to low ridership. The extension to Eton Drive, subsidized by local real estate developers, started carrying passengers July 20, 1925. Beginning on December 1 that same year, trains were routed through the Belmont Tunnel ("Hollywood Subway") between the Subway Terminal Building and Glendale Boulevard in Westlake. 

Many trips were replaced with buses starting in 1936, but community feedback from Burbank and Glendale was so great that the California State Railroad Commission pressured the railway to re-expand the service. A full rail schedule was restored in 1940 along with discontinuation of the Eton Drive extension.

The last car on the Broadway section ran on Christmas Eve 1946. On October 1, 1953, the route came under the purview of Metropolitan Coach Lines, who proceeded a series of service reductions. Rail service to North Glendale was discontinued on June 18, 1955, with Burbank service also ending at the end of the service day. The route was converted to bus operation.

All tracks along the route had been removed by 1981. Supports for the Glendale-Hyperion Bridge over the Los Angeles River were reused for a cycling and pedestrian path in Atwater Village which opened in 2020; the Atwater Red Car Pedestrian Bridge is named in honor of the Red Cars which once used the route.

Rolling stock
To expand service after 1936, Pacific Electric purchased unique double-ended PCC streetcars to run on the line. Cars were formed into trains up to three long. These cars were retired in 1955 along with the service.

Local services also operated over the line, starting at Whitmore Avenue in Edendale and running south — bypassing the Hollywood Subway on surface tracks to terminate at the Southern Pacific Railroad's Arcade Depot (later Central Station). These trips were extended north to Monte Sano in 1936. With the opening of Union Station, tracks were removed leading to the former Southern Pacific depot and Locals were rerouted into the Hollywood Subway starting in September 1940. By that November, Glendale–Burbank trains took over most local duties, with Edendale Local runs relegated to rush hours and going as far as Richardson. The Line saw a resurgence in World War II, but dedicated service was gradually withdrawn. Metropolitan Coach Lines finally dropped the last vestiges of the Edendale Local in June 1955.

See also
Streetcar suburb
Streetcars in North America
List of California railroads
History of rail transportation in California

References

Bibliography

External links
 Glendale-Burbank line pictures and documents via Dorothy Peyton Gray Transportation Library and Archive, Los Angeles County Metropolitan Transportation Authority
 1955 Timetable
 
 2 Competing Visions for Silver Lake Property — Los Angeles Times article concerning development on a portion of the right of way

Pacific Electric routes
Atwater Village, Los Angeles
Burbank, California
Transportation in Glendale, California
History of the San Fernando Valley
History of Los Angeles
1902 establishments in California
Railway lines opened in 1902
Railway lines closed in 1955
1955 disestablishments in California
Closed railway lines in the United States